Tikhon Alexandrovich Yurkin (1898, Moscow, Russian Empire – 1986, Moscow, Russian Soviet Federative Socialist Republic) was a Soviet statesman.

Biography
He was born on June 29, 1898, in the family of a water carrier. Russian. Member of the Russian Communist Party (Bolsheviks) since 1919.
From 1911 – a turner at the factories of Moscow and Petrograd;
From 1919, he served in food detachments in Valuyki and Samara;
In 1922–1924, he was the manager of the Soviet Farm "Krasny Khutor" (Kropotkin);
In 1924–1928, he was the director of the Soviet Farm "Khutorok" (Armavir);
In 1928–1930, he was the organizer and first director of the Soviet Grain Farm Gigant. In 1930 – chairman of the Board of the All–Union Union of Agricultural Collectives of the Soviet Union;
From 1930 – a candidate member of the Central Committee of the All–Union Communist Party (Bolsheviks);
In 1931 – Chairman of the State Association of Union Trusts of Grain Farms;
In 1932–1934 and 1937–1938 – People's Commissar of Grain and Livestock Soviet Farms of the Soviet Union;
In 1934–1936 – First Deputy People's Commissar of Grain and Livestock Soviet Farms of the Soviet Union;
In 1936–1937 – People's Commissar of Grain and Livestock Soviet Farms of the Russian Soviet Federative Socialist Republic;
From July 22, 1937 – People's Commissar of Grain and Livestock Soviet Farms of the Soviet Union;
In the autumn of 1938, he was accused by Beria of spying for the United States of America. Stalin did not agree with the accusations, but on November 21, 1938, Yurkin was removed from the post of People's Commissar "as having failed to do his job" and in the same year was removed from the Central Committee of the All–Union Communist Party (Bolsheviks);
In 1939–1943, he was the director of the Soviet Farm "May 1" in Balashikha. During the war, he met and began to live in a civil marriage with Lyudmila Ponomareva;
In 1948, he received a secondary education – he graduated from the Kupyansk Agricultural College (Kharkov Oblast) as an external student;
In 1949–1953, he was a member of the board and head of the Main Directorate of Soviet Livestock Farms of the Ministry of the Meat and Dairy Industry of the Soviet Union;
In 1953–1954 – Deputy Minister of Soviet Farms of the Russian Soviet Federative Socialist Republic;
In 1954–1957, he was the Minister of Soviet Farms of the Russian Soviet Federative Socialist Republic;
In 1958–1959 – Deputy Minister of Agriculture of the Russian Soviet Federative Socialist Republic;
In 1959–1960 – First Deputy Minister of Agriculture of the Russian Soviet Federative Socialist Republic;
In 1960–1961, he was Minister of Grain Products of the Russian Soviet Federative Socialist Republic;
In 1961–1962, he was Minister of Procurement of the Russian Soviet Federative Socialist Republic;
In 1962–1967, he was an adviser to the Council of Ministers of the Russian Soviet Federative Socialist Republic;
In 1967–1984, he was an adviser to the Council of Ministers of the Soviet Union. Deputy of the Supreme Soviet of the Soviet Union from the Novosibirsk Region;
From 1984 – a personal pensioner of union significance;
He died on August 18 (19), 1986, was buried at the Kuntsevo Cemetery (Site No. 10).

Family
Grandfather of Alexey Semyonov, Sergei Sumarokov, Asya Yurkina, Elena Stepanova.

Father of Yuri Yurkin, Olga Sumarokova, Evgenia Semyonova (Yurkina), Eleonora Yurkina.

Great–uncle (husband of grandfather's sister) of the deputy of the State Duma of the Russian Federation Ilya Ponomarev.

Awards
He was awarded four Orders of Lenin, the Order of the October Revolution, the Order of Friendship of Peoples.

References

External links
Speech by Comrade Yurkin at the 17th Congress of the All–Union Communist Party (Bolsheviks) (January 30, 1934)
Yurkin Tikhon Alexandrovich

1898 births
Recipients of the Order of Lenin
Recipients of the Order of Friendship of Peoples
Burials at Kuntsevo Cemetery
People's commissars and ministers of the Russian Soviet Federative Socialist Republic
Central Committee of the Communist Party of the Soviet Union candidate members
First convocation members of the Supreme Soviet of the Soviet Union
1986 deaths